Vanity Fare (often misspelled Vanity Fair, due to the similarity of the novel and magazine title) are an English pop/rock group formed in 1966. They had the million-selling song, "Hitchin' a Ride", which became a worldwide hit in 1970.

Career
School friends Trevor Brice (born 12 February 1945, Rochester, Kent, England) (vocals), Tony Goulden (born Anthony Goulden, 21 November 1942, Rochester) (guitar), Dick Allix (born Richard Allix, 3 May 1945, Gravesend, Kent) (drums) and Tony Jarrett (born Anthony Jarrett, 4 September 1943, in Rochester, Kent) (bass) formed the band in Kent in 1966, originally calling themselves The Avengers. Under that name, they recorded a number of demos, including "Marianne", with record producer Joe Meek, but none were ever released. After that, they changed their name to The Sages, and had one 45 single release on the RCA Victor label (47–8760), with "In The Beginning" on the A side and "I'm Not Going To Cry" on the B side. They played local clubs and were spotted by entrepreneur Roger Easterby who became their manager and producer. Having changed the name of the band to Vanity Fare after the novel Vanity Fair by William Makepeace Thackeray, they signed to Larry Page's Page One Records.

In the summer of 1968, Vanity Fare achieved a UK hit single with their first release, a cover of "I Live for the Sun", originally recorded in 1965 by the California group The Sunrays.

Following two more singles, "Summer Morning" and "Highway of Dreams," both of which failed to make the UK Singles Chart, they released their biggest UK hit, "Early in the Morning". Written by Mike Leander and Eddie Seago, it reached number 8 in that country in August 1969, number 12 in the US, and number 10 in Canada in early 1970. It sold over one million copies, and was awarded a gold disc.

For their next release "Hitchin' a Ride", they added keyboardist Barry Landeman (born 25 October 1947, Woodbridge, Suffolk, England), formerly of Kippington Lodge, to the group. "Hitchin' A Ride", written by Peter Callander and Mitch Murray, gave them a second million-selling hit, reaching No. 16 in the UK (January 1970), No. 1 for two weeks each on Chicago radio stations WCFL (May 1970) and WLS (June 1970), No. 5 on the Hot 100 (June–July 1970), and No. 3 in Canada.

The hit was preceded by a tour of the United States, following which both Dick Allix and Tony Goulden left the band and were replaced by guitarist and singer Eddie Wheeler and drummer Mark Ellen (died 18 February 2021).

Two more singles followed before the end of 1970: Mike Leander and Eddie Seago's "Come Tomorrow" and Roger Cook and Roger Greenaway's "Carolina's Coming Home", both of which failed to dent the charts on either side of the Atlantic.  In addition, a belated US release of "Summer Morning" reached only No. 98, for two weeks.

Over the next couple of years more singles were released including Tony Macaulay's "Better By Far" on DJM Records in 1972, but none of them entered the charts. Following that, they decided to concentrate on live performances, touring Europe, where they were having hit singles. Following the mid-1970s, and amid many band member changes, including the departure of Jarrett, who was replaced by Bernie Hagley, the group recorded only sporadically. In 1986, they attempted to represent the UK in the Eurovision Song Contest, finishing third in the UK heat of A Song for Europe, with the song "Dreamer", featuring Jimmy Cassidy on vocals and Phil Kitto on keyboards, alongside long-time members Ellen, Wheeler and Bernie Hagley. In 2007, they toured alongside P. J. Proby. In August 2015, after having played with the band for 43 years, drummer Mark Ellen retired and was replaced by Howard Tibble. In 2018, Graham Walker, from Gary Moore Band, took over on drums. 

Vanity Fare are still performing today, with the line-up of Hagley, Wheeler, Walker and Steve Oakman. In his spare time, Brice sings second tenor with the City of Bath Male Choir, which reached the final of BBC One's  Last Choir Standing. His son, Sebastian Brice, is part of the alt/rock band Avius.

Discography

Albums

Studio albums 

 The Sun. The Wind. And Other Things (1968)
 Early in the Morning (1970)

Compilation albums 

 Coming Home (1970)
 Vanity Fare (1981)
 Beach Party (1988)
 Will You Still Love Me Tomorrow (1994)
 The Best of Vanity Fare (2004)
 Hitchin' a Ride (2013)
 I Live for the Sun: Complete Recordings 1966–76 (2015)

Singles

See also
List of performances on Top of the Pops

Notes

References

External links
 Band's official website
 [ Vanity Fare] at Allmusic
 

English pop music groups
Musical groups established in 1966
Bell Records artists
1966 establishments in England
People from Kent